Job Wilding (1862 – 15 March 1947) was a Welsh professional footballer who played as a forward. He was among the first full-time professional football players in England.

He made his international debut for the Wales national team on 14 March 1885, in the Wales versus England match at Leamington Road, Blackburn. He was also Everton F.C.'s first player to represent Wales at full international level.

References 

1862 births
1947 deaths
Welsh footballers
Footballers from Wrexham
Association football forwards
Wales international footballers
Everton F.C. players
Wrexham A.F.C. players
Wrexham Victoria F.C. players
Westminster Rovers F.C. players